Porphyrios (Greek: Πορφύριος) was a large whale that harassed and sank ships in the waters near Constantinople in the sixth century. Active over a period of over fifty years, Porphyrios caused great concern for Byzantine seafarers and Emperor Justinian I made it an important matter to capture it, though he could not come up with a way to do so. Porphyrios eventually met its end when it beached itself near the mouth of the Black Sea and was attacked and cut into pieces by a mob of locals.

Name 
The whale was given the name Porphyrios by Byzantine sailors; the name is sometimes alternatively rendered as Porphyrius, Porphyrion, Porphyry or Porphyrio and its origin is not clear. Common hypotheses on the name include it being derived from the contemporary charioteer Porphyrius or from the mythological giant Porphyrion, who waged war against the gods of Greek mythology. Anthony Kaldellis suggested in 2010 that the name of the whale alluded to the imperial purple and was thus "a sign of the respect in which the whale was held". This idea was also supported by Sian Lewis and Lloyd Llewellyn-Jones in 2018, who believed the name alluded to the color of royalty and was a sign of great awe for the whale.

In 1996, James Allan Stewart Evans suggested that the name was a reference to the color of the whale's skin.  meant a deep purple color in Greek and Porphyrios might have had dark-wine colored skin. This was further supported by John K. Papadopoulos and Deborah Ruscillo in 2002, who believed the name simply meant "purple". Daniel Ogden in 2008 also supported the idea that Porphyrios evoked the color of the whale, believing that the name was best interpreted as "purple boy". Kaldellis also supported this etymology in 2017.

Life 
Porphyrios is mentioned in the writings of the 6th-century Byzantine historian Procopius, both in the History of the Wars (VII 29) and The Secret History. According to Procopius, Porphyrios measured 13.7 meters (45 ft) long and 4.6 meters (15 ft) wide. Whales were not well understood in antiquity or in the Middle Ages and were often seen simply as great monsters.

It is not possible to confidently identify which species Porphyrios belonged to. It might have been a sperm whale or perhaps an unusually large orca. Porphyrios being a sperm whale is supported by its size, lengthy lifespan and temperament. On the other hand, identification as an orca is supported by its geographical location, since true whales rarely venture into the waters which Porphyrios is known to have frequented. If the name is a reference to the skin color, it could support either identification since both the black of orcas and dark brownish gray of sperm whales could be misinterpreted as dark purple.

Porphyrios harassed ships in the waters of Constantinople for over fifty years, though not continuously since it at times disappeared for lengthy periods of time. It most frequently appeared in the Bosporus Strait. Porphyrios made no distinctions in regard to which ships it attacked, recorded as having attacked fishing vessels, merchant ships and warships. Many ships were sunk by Porphyrios, and its mere reputation terrified the crews of many more; ships often took detours to go around the waters where the whale most commonly swam. Emperor Justinian I, perplexed by the whale attacks and wishing to keep sea routes safe, made it a matter of great concern to capture Porphyrios, though he was unable to devise a means through which to do this.

When chasing dolphins one day, Porphyrios ran aground near the mouth of the Black Sea and was beached. Though Porphyrios struggled and attempted to get out of the mud, it only managed to sink deeper into the mud, and become more stuck. Locals in the vicinity quickly organized themselves into a mob to kill the famous sea monster, rushing out with axes and ropes. They first made an attempt to kill Porphyrios using their axes, but their cuts into its flesh had little effect. Using ropes and wagons, Porphyrios was then hauled further up the beach and the whale was attacked and began being cut into pieces. Some of the attackers stored their portion of the meat away whereas others began to consume it on the spot.

Legacy 
According to Procopius, the death of Porphyrios was a great relief to the general population, though some speculated that the killed whale might in fact have been a completely different whale than the one that had harassed seafarers. Porphyrios is the earliest documented case of a rogue whale attacking seafarers.

Porphyrios was mentioned in Edward Gibbon's The History of the Decline and Fall of the Roman Empire (1776–1789); Gibbon believed Porphyrios to have been a "stranger and wanderer" since there are no species comparable to it in size and behavior in the Mediterranean. In the commentary of George Horne (1730–1792) on Gibbon's Decline and Fall, Horne interpreted Gibbon's passage on the whale as subtly implying that it was a fictional beast. Angered by this, Horne wrote on Porphyrios that "either God had prepared a whale specially for this purpose, or it was not a whale at all". The tale of Porphyrios is mentioned in Herman Melville's Moby-Dick (1851) as a historical case of a whale attacking humans.

Porphyrios appears in Robert Graves's historical fiction novel Count Belisarius (1938). In Count Belisarius, Justinian, after receiving complaints from friends and acquintances of his wife Empress Theodora, dispatches the famed general Belisarius to hunt for the whale. Belisarius takes a warship equipped with a catapult to search for Porphyrios and the whale is discovered while heading towards Constantinople. The crew begin firing harpoons and arrows, though this has little effect as Porphyrios then dives beneath the waves and swims away. The battle between Belisarius and Porphyrios has sometimes erroneously been mentioned as a real event by some later authors.

See also 

 List of individual cetaceans

References 

Medieval individual animals
Individual cetaceans
Justinian I